Youssoufia is a town and commune in Tissemsilt Province in northern Algeria.

History 
Until 1989, the town of Youssoufia was called Oued Gherga.

References

Communes of Tissemsilt Province